The Dessau Palace in Dessau in the German state of Saxony-Anhalt was a princely palace which mostly served as the main residence of the princes of Anhalt-Dessau and later the Dukes of Anhalt. The palace was one of the first renaissance buildings in the middle of Germany (see also: Saxon Renaissance). Today, there is only one wing remaining, the Johannbau, which offers room to the City History Museum of Dessau.

A four winged palace was constructed in the start of the 16th century on the place of burnt down castle. Under the architect Georg Wenzeslaus von Knobelsdorff the palace was changed into an 18th-century three-winged palace.

The palace was heavily damaged during the Second World War, and its ruins were largely demolished in the times of the DDR. Only one wing, the Johannbau, is remaining. After restorations between 1990 and 1997, and between 2001 and 2005, the Johannbau has been opened for the public and houses now the museum for the history of Dessau.

Bibliography
 
 Barbara Czerannowski: Das Schloss zu Dessau. Eine Baugeschichte. In: Hans Wilderotter (Hg.): "Schauplatz vernünftiger Menschen" Kultur und Geschichte in Anhalt-Dessau, Berlin: L-und-H-Verlag 2006, S. 17–42.

External links

 Website of the City History Museum in Dessau
 the Johannbau wing

Castles in Saxony-Anhalt
Dessau
Museums in Saxony-Anhalt
Palaces in Saxony-Anhalt